Shahrab (also Romanized as Shahrāb; also known as Sarāb) is a village in Sofla Rural District, Zavareh District, Ardestan County, Isfahan Province, Iran. At the 2006 census, its population was 173, in 71 families.

References 

Populated places in Ardestan County